The following is a list of Mission hospitals.

Afghanistan
CURE International Hospital of Kabul

Bangladesh 
Christian Missionary Hospital, Brahmanbaria
LAMB Integrated Rural Health & Development Project, Parbatipur
Christian Missionary Hospital, Rajshahi 
Memorial Christian Hospital, Cox's Bazar
DBLM, The Leprosy Mission, Nilphamari, India
Christian Missionary Hospital, Comilla
Fatima Hospital, Jessore

China

Dominican Republic
Centro de Ortopedia y Especialidades CURE International

Ethiopia 
CURE Ethiopia Children's Hospital
Myungsung Christian Medical Center

Ghana 
Baptist Medical Centre

India 
Hospitals of Emmanuel Hospital Association
 Makunda Christian Leprosy & General Hospital, Makunda, Karimganj, Assam
Burrows Memorial Christian Hospital, Cachar, Assam
Baptist Christian Hospital, Tezpur, Assam
Jivan Jyoti Christian Hospital, Robertsganj, Uttar Pradesh
Broadwell Christian Hospital, Hariharganj, Fatehpur, Uttar Pradesh
Harriet Benson Memorial Hospital, Lalitpur, Uttar Pradesh
Landour Community Hospital, Mussoorie, Uttarakhand
Champa Christian Hospital, Champa, Chhattisgarh
Duncan Hospital, Raxaul, East Champaran, Bihar
Prem Jyoti Community Hospital, Barharwa, Jharkhand
Herbertpur Christian Hospital, Herbertpur,  Dehradun, Uttarakhand

Hospitals of MarThoma Medical Mission
Ashram Hospital, Darshani, Sihora, Madhya Pradesh
Hoskote Mission & Medical Centre, Hoskote, Bangalore, Karnataka
C.M.Ashram Hospital, Ankola,North Canara, Karnataka
Mar Thoma Mission Hospital-Chungathara, Chungathara, Malappuram, Kerala
Fellowship Mission Hospital, Kumbanad, Pathanamthitta, Kerala
St.Thomas Mission Hospital & Institute of Medical Sciences, Kattanam, Kerala

Hospitals of ERBHS 
ERBHS (Eastern Regional Board of Health Services) runs 7 hospitals in Central India which belong to the Church of North India. This independent governing body's mission is to provide health care for all. It oversees the following hospitals:
 Christian Hospital Mungeli, CG. (http://chmungeli.org/)
 Evangelical Hospital, Tilda, CG
 Christian Hospital Baitalpur, CG
 Christian Hospital Diptipur (not currently functioning)
 Evangelical Hospital Khariar, Khariar, Odisha
 Christian Hospital, Berhamnpur, Odisha
 Jackman Hospital, Bilaspur, CG
 St. Luke's Hospital, Hiranpur, Pakur, Jharkhand (www.stlukeshiranpur.com )
  Hospitals of Jeypore Evangelical Lutheran Church
 Christian Hospital, Bissamcuttack, Rayagada, Odisha ( http://chbmck.org/ )
 Christian Hospital, Nabarangpur, Odisha ( http://chnabarangpur.com/ )

Top Christian hospitals in India
Christian Medical College, Vellore, Tamil Nadu 
Christian Hospital Mungeli, CG. (http://chmungeli.org/) 
Bangalore Baptist Hospital, Hebbal, Bangalore, Karnataka
Christian Medical College, Ludhiana, Punjab
Mission of Mercy Hospital & Research centre, Kolkata, West Bengal

Hospitals of CMC
Christian Medical College, Vellore, Tamil Nadu 
Bangalore Baptist Hospital, Hebbal, Bangalore, Karnataka

Hospitals of CSI

CSI Campbell Mission Hospital, Jammalamadugu, Kadapa

Kanyakumari Medical Mission

CSI Mission Hospital Neyyoor

CSI Hospital Nagercoil

CSI Hospital Marthandam

CSI Hospital, Brough Road, Erode, Tamil Nadu
CSI Hospital, Bangalore, Karnataka
CSI Hospital, Gadag-Betgeri, Karnataka
CSI Eva Lombard Memorial Hospital, Udupi, Karnataka
Mary Lott Lyles Hospital, Madanapalle, Andhra Pradesh
CSI Kalyani Hospital, Chennai
CSI Rainy Hospital, Chennai
CSI Thiruvallur Hospital, Thiruvallur
CSI Kanchipuram Hospital, Kanchipuram
CSI Nagari Hospital, Nagari, A.P.
CSI Ikkadu Hospital, Ikkadu Thiruvallur Dist.

Other Christian hospitals in India
Mure Memorial Hospital, Nagpur, Maharashtra
 Francis Newton Mission Hospital, Firozpur, Punjab
Bangalore Baptist Hospital, Hebbal, Bangalore, Karnataka
Kugler Hospital, Guntur, Andhra Pradesh
Ruth Sigmon Memorial Lutheran Hospital, Guntur, Andhra Pradesh
St.Joseph Hospital, Guntur, Andhra Pradesh
Baer Christian Hospital, Chirala, Andhra Pradesh
Padhar Hospital, Padhar, Betul, Madhya Pradesh
Christanand Hospital, bramhapuri, Maharastra
Scudder Memorial Hospital, Ranipet, Tamil Nadu
Central India Christian Mission Hospital, Damoh, Assam
St. Joseph's Hospital, Baramulla
The Madras Medical Mission Hospital, Chennai
Pondicherry Institute of Medical Sciences, Puducherry

Iran
Isfahan Christian Hospital (بیمارستان عیسی بن مریم) (fa)
Shiraz Christian Missionary Hospital
Yazd Missionary Clinic

Israel
The Nazareth Hospital
The French Hospital (Nazareth)
The Austrian Hospital (Nazareth)

Kenya
AIC-CURE International Hospital

Liberia
E.L.W.A. (Eternal Love Winning Africa) Hospital

Malawi 
Beit CURE International Hospital
Malamulo Mission Hospital
Mulanje Mission Hospital
Nkhoma Mission Hospital

Mali
Outiala Hospital

Nepal 
HDCS-TEAM Hospital Dadeldhura
Lamjung District Community Hospital
Palpa Mission Hospital
Okhaldunga Hospital

Niger
CURE Hôpital des Enfants au Niger

Pakistan
 Bach Christian Hospital
 Christian Hospital, Kunri
 Christian Hospital, Quetta
 Christian Hospital, Sahiwal
Mission Hospital, Peshawar
 Henry Holland Mission Eye Hospital, Shikarpur
 Holy Family Hospital, Rawalpindi
 Kinhar Christian Hospital, Garhihabibulla, Mansehra
 Mission Hospital, Quetta
 Memorial Christian hospital, Sialkot
 St. Elizabeth Hospital, Hyderabad
 Taxila Christian Hospital
 United Christian Hospital, Lahore
 Women's Christian Hospital, Multan

Philippines
Iloilo Mission Hospital
Tebow CURE Hospital

Thailand 
Bangkok Adventist Hospital, commonly referred to as "Mission Hospital."

Uganda
CURE Children's Hospital of Uganda

United Arab Emirates
Oasis Hospital

United States 
Mission Hospital (Mission Viejo, California)
Mission Hospital (Asheville, North Carolina)

Zambia 
Beit CURE Hospital of Zambia
Minga Mission Hospital

Zimbabwe 
Karanda Mission Hospital
Mbuma Mission Hospital
Chidamoyo Christian Hospital
Makonde Christian Hospital
Mashoko Christian Hospital
Morgenster Mission Hospital
Mtshabezi Mission Hospital
Bonda Mission Hospital
Murambinda Mission Hospital
Mutambara Mission Hospital
Tshelanyemba Mission Hospital
Luisa Guidotti Hospital
Elim Mission Hospital
Songati Baptist Hospital
Rusite Mission Hospital
St Joseph Mission Hospital Mutare

References

Christian mission hospitals
Hospitals
 Mission hospitals
Hospitals